Professor Roni Michaely is an SFI professor of finance at Geneva Finance Research Institute at the University of Geneva. Before that he was a Rudd Family Professor of Management and a professor of finance at Cornell University's Johnson Graduate School of Management.  He obtained his PhD from New York University.

Michaely's research interests are in the area of corporate finance, capital markets and valuation. His current research focuses on conflict of interest in the capital markets, corporation payout policy, and the pricing and optimal trading mechanisms of IPOs.

Michaely has published numerous works (several of which received best-paper awards) in refereed journals such as the Review of Financial Studies, the Journal of Finance, the Journal of Business, and the Journal of Financial and Quantitative Analysis. His research has been also frequently featured in the Wall Street Journal, the New York Times, the Economist, Investor's Business Daily, the San Francisco Chronicle, BusinessWeek, Forbes, Barrons, Money, Reuters, Worth, among others.

A 1999-2000 Whitcomb Fellow who received the Johnson School Award for Exceptional Research for 2001–2002, Michaely's research has received several awards and honors. Recent awards include the 2000 Journal of Finance Smith Breeden Prize for distinguished paper, the 2000 Western Finance Association Award for the best paper on capital formation, the Review of Financial Studies 1999 Barclays Global Investors/Michael Brennan Runner-up Award, the 1999 Western Finance Association Award for the best paper, 1996 Quantitative Alliance Group Prize for best paper, and the 1996 Western Finance Association Award for best paper on investments.

Michaely was appointed to a director of the Israel Securities Authority (ISA) in January 1998. He currently also serves as an associate editor for the Review of Financial Studies.

In 2012, Michaely invested in TipRanks – a tech company that lends transparency into the financial markets by showing investors the track record and performance of anyone who gives financial advice. He is an active member of the board of directors.

Recent publications 

Allen, F. and R. Michaely (forthcoming). Payout policy. North-Holland Handbooks of Economics. G. Constantinides, M. Harris and R. Stulz.
Ellis, K., R. Michaely and M. O'Hara (2002). "The making of a dealer market: From entry to equilibrium in the trading of NASDAQ stocks." Journal of Finance 57(5): 2289–2316.
Grullon, G., R. Michaely and B. Swaminathan (2002). "Are dividend changes a sign of firm maturity?" Journal of Business 75(3): 387–424.
Grullon, G. and R. Michaely (2002). "Dividends, share repurchases, and the substitution hypothesis." Journal of Finance 57(4): 1649–1684.
Llorente, G., R. Michaely, G. Saar and J. Wang (2002). "Dynamic volume-return relation of individual stocks." Review of Financial Studies 15(4): 1005–1047.

References 

Cornell University's Biography

External links 
Professor Roni Michaely's Curriculum Vita
Links to Research

Cornell University faculty
Johnson School faculty
Living people
Year of birth missing (living people)